Kunzang Bhutia (born 3 January 1994) is an Indian professional footballer who currently plays as a goalkeeper for Bengaluru United.

Youth career 
Born in Lachung, Sikkim, Bhutia was inspired by his uncle and aunt to play football. He started playing the game as a defender before being converted into a goalkeeper. He led the Sikkim under-16 side during the junior nationals in Goa. He then joined the Sports Authority of India and played matches for the academy in Delhi before joining the youth side at Royal Wahingdoh. Bhutia then represented his state of Sikkim in the 2010 Santosh Trophy at the age of 17.

Career

Shillong Lajong 
Bhutia joined Shillong Lajong in 2013. After returning from loan, Bhutia made his professional debut for Shillong Lajong in the I-League on 28 March 2015 against Sporting Goa. He came on in the 52nd minute for forward, David Ngaihte, after Shillong's starting goalkeeper, Vishal Kaith, was sent off. Bhutia went on to play the rest of the match and not concede as Shillong Lajong drew the match 1–1.

Northeast United (loan) 
Despite not playing a single match in the I-League for Shillong Lajong, Bhutia was signed on loan by NorthEast United of the Indian Super League. After the season,

Atlético de Kolkata. (loan) 
After the season, Bhutia went out on loan again in the Indian Super League, this time to Atlético de Kolkata.

Tollygunge Agragami 
After returning from loan and playing the 2015–16 season with Shillong Lajong, Bhutia signed with Calcutta Football League side Tollygunge Agragami.

Fateh Hyderabad 
In November 2016, Bhutia signed with I-League 2nd Division side Fateh Hyderabad. He made his debut for the side in their season opener against Pride Sports on 21 January 2017. He started the match and kept the clean sheet as Fateh Hyderabad won 2–0.

ATK 
In July 2017, Bhutia was drafted by Indian Super League franchise ATK, where he didn't play a single game.

Churchill Brothers 
In July 2018 Bhutia signed with I-League side Churchill Brothers

Career statistics

References

External links 
 Indian Super League Profile.

1994 births
Living people
People from Mangan district
Indian footballers
Royal Wahingdoh FC players
Shillong Lajong FC players
NorthEast United FC players
ATK (football club) players
Fateh Hyderabad A.F.C. players
Association football goalkeepers
Footballers from Sikkim
I-League players
I-League 2nd Division players
Tollygunge Agragami FC players
Churchill Brothers FC Goa players
Hyderabad FC players
Indian Super League players
Calcutta Football League players